The communauté de communes du Pays de Boussac  was created on December 28, 1992 and is located in the Creuse département of the Limousin  region of central France. It was created in January 1993. It was merged into the new Communauté de communes Creuse Confluence in January 2017.

It comprised the following 13 communes:

Bord-Saint-Georges
Boussac
Boussac-Bourg
Bussière-Saint-Georges
Lavaufranche
Leyrat
Malleret-Boussac
Nouzerines
Saint-Marien
Saint-Pierre-le-Bost
Saint-Silvain-Bas-le-Roc
Soumans
Toulx-Sainte-Croix

See also
Communes of the Creuse department

References  

Boussac